Loma may refer to:

Geography 
United States
 Loma, Colorado
 Loma, Montana
 Loma, Nebraska
 Loma, North Dakota

Other countries
 Loma, Ladakh, a town in Ladakh, India
 Loma (woreda), a district in Southern Nations, Nationalities, and Peoples' Region, Ethiopia
 Loma (Jandaha), a village in Vaishali, Bihar, India
 Loma Mountains, a mountain range in Sierra Leone

Anthropology 
 Loma people, of Guinea and Liberia
 Loma language, spoken by the Loma

People 

 Vasiliy Lomachenko (born 1988), Ukrainian professional boxer

Other uses 
 Loma (microsporidian), a genus of microsporidians
 Loma Records, a 1960s subsidiary of Warner Bros. Records
 Letter of Map Amendment (LOMA), a document issued by the National Flood Insurance Program
 Life Office Management Association (LOMA), an insurance trade association
 Vasyl Lomachenko (born 1988), Ukrainian professional boxer
 Loma Lookboonmee

See also

Lota (name)

Language and nationality disambiguation pages